This is a list of singles that have peaked in the top 10 of the French Singles Chart in 2018. 110 singles reached the top ten this year with 17 peaking at number one.

Top-ten singles

Entries by artists
The following table shows artists who achieved two or more top 10 entries in 2018. The figures include both main artists and featured artists and the peak position in brackets.

See also
2018 in music
List of number-one hits of 2018 (France)

References

External links
 Les Charts.com

Top
France top 10
Top 10 singles in 2018
France 2018